Ushio may refer to:

 Japanese destroyer Ushio, two IJN ships
 Ushio Okazaki, a fictional character from Clannad
 Ushio (magazine) (潮), a Japanese magazine which has a strong connection with Soka Gakkai
 Ushio Shuppansha (潮出版社）, the Japanese publisher
 Ushio Inc., partner of Jenoptik AG in an Intel funding for an EUV-Lithography joint-venture
 Ushio, Inc. (ウシオ電機), a publicly traded Japanese company with its headquarters in Tokyo
 Ushio and Tora, a 1990 Japanese manga

People with the surname
 Keizo Ushio, a Japanese sculptor
 , Japanese composer and musician
 , Japanese hairdresser, businesswoman and photographer

Japanese-language surnames